Conor Pepper (born 4 May 1994) is an Irish professional association football player, who plays as a midfielder or full-back for Linfield.

Career
Born in Dublin, Pepper played youth football with Portmarnock AFC and Cherry Orchard AFC. He played for St. Patrick's Athletic Under 19s and also made one first team appearance in the Leinster Senior Cup in a Dublin derby away to Shamrock Rovers, before signing for Scottish Premier League club Inverness Caledonian Thistle in July 2012.

He made his first competitive appearance for Inverness on 18 August 2012. During this appearance he scored a late equalising goal in a 2–2 draw against Hearts at Tynecastle. He made an assist in his second match, a 4–2 loss against Celtic. Then scored his second goal for the club in his first start away at Hibernian.

Pepper has represented the Republic of Ireland at youth international levels.

Despite a promising first campaign with Inverness with Terry Butcher, Pepper failed to feature during his second season and was subsequently released by the club in May 2014 by manager John Hughes.

However, Pepper stayed in Scottish football by signing for Greenock Morton. He agreed a new deal with Morton in May 2016. Pepper was part of the team that won the Scottish league One title in his first season at Greenock Morton. Pepper featured in every game up of his second campaign until February 2016 when suffered a knee injury and didn't feature again for the first-team. After 3 seasons with Morton, Pepper left the club in May 2017 at the end of his contract.

After spending 2 years without playing first-team football, still recovering from injury, Pepper moved to Belfast to sign for NIFL Premiership side Glentoran. In his first month as a Glentoran player, Pepper won the Glentoran Supporters Player of the Month Award for August 2018 with 85% of the vote. Pepper was praised by his manager Mick McDermott, who said "I have said it before, and I will say it again, that we have the best two full-backs in the league" After two seasons with Glentoran, Pepper signed for Big Two rivals Linfield.

Honours
Morton
Scottish League One: 2014–15

Glentoran
Irish Cup: 2019–20 

Linfield
 NIFL Premiership: 2020-21
Irish Cup: 2020-21

Career statistics

References

External links

1994 births
Living people
Republic of Ireland association footballers
Expatriate footballers in Scotland
St Patrick's Athletic F.C. players
League of Ireland players
Inverness Caledonian Thistle F.C. players
Republic of Ireland youth international footballers
Scottish Premier League players
Association footballers from Dublin (city)
Greenock Morton F.C. players
Scottish Professional Football League players
Republic of Ireland expatriate association footballers
Cherry Orchard F.C. players
Irish expatriate sportspeople in Scotland
Association football defenders
Association football midfielders
Glentoran F.C. players
NIFL Premiership players
Linfield F.C. players